XXV Corps was a corps of the Union Army during the American Civil War.  It was unique in that it was made up almost entirely of African-American troops. These soldiers had previously belonged to the X Corps and XVIII Corps. As the XXV, they captured Richmond, Virginia, the capital of the Confederacy, in 1865 and also stopped general Robert E. Lee's army at Appomattox Court House —where the Confederates officially surrendered a week later.

History
On December 3, 1864, the two corps of the Army of the James were reorganized.  Its white units went to the XXIV Corps, while the black units became the XXV Corps, under the command of Major General Godfrey Weitzel. The new XXV Corps served with distinction during the waning days of the Petersburg Campaign. Its main noteworthy action was being the first command to occupy Richmond on April 3, 1865.  In May the corps was sent to Texas to serve as the "Army of Occupation" against Napoleon III's French presence in Mexico. The XXV Corps was disbanded in January 1866.

External links
XXV Corps history

25
Military units and formations established in 1864
African-American military units and formations of the American Civil War
1864 establishments in the United States
Military units and formations disestablished in 1865